Christ Church College, Matale is a mixed state school in Matale, Sri Lanka.

History
The college was established in 1864, as the Christ Church Boy’s English Elementary School, in the garden of Lady Sophie McCarthy, by the church missionaries of the Kurunegala Diocese. The first Sri Lankan Scout troop was established at the school by a British Highways Engineer, Francis George Stevens, in 1912.

Notable alumni 

 Don Stephen Senanayake - Prime Minister of Sri Lanka (1947–1952)
 William Gopallawa - President of Sri Lanka (1972–1978)
 Richard Aluwihare - Inspector-General of Police (1947–1955)
 Prabath Jayasuriya - ODI cricketer

Principals 

 Dulani Samarakoon

 T. W. Mediwake
 Dharmasiri Pandigama
 Lester P. Ranathunga
 Fonseka
 Mahathmaluwa

See also 
 List of schools in Sri Lanka

References

Educational institutions established in 1864
Schools in Matale
1864 establishments in Ceylon